Alberto Bozzato (8 April 1930 – 18 June 2022) was an Italian rower. He competed in the men's eight event at the 1952 Summer Olympics.

References

External links
 
 

1930 births
2022 deaths
Italian male rowers
Olympic rowers of Italy
Rowers at the 1952 Summer Olympics
Sportspeople from Venice